The Silver Nugget is a casino and arena located on Las Vegas Boulevard North in North Las Vegas, Nevada. The casino is owned and operated by Fifth Street Gaming.

The sports book is operated by Leroy's Race & Sports Book.  The casino also offers a bowling center and Bingo.

The casino resumed boxing matches, an old tradition which had not been offered for many years in North Las Vegas.  The first fight card was on September 30, 2008 with plans to continue offering matches featuring regional fighters.

History 
The casino was opened in 1964 by Major Riddle. In 1966, the Silver Nugget became one of the first Las Vegas casinos to have female card dealers. The casino was purchased by Silver Nugget Gaming in January 2007 for $23.8 million, a price that included the Opera House Casino. The company is privately held with Jeffrey Fine as the owner. Fine also own several Coffee Bean & Tea Leaf locations.

In 2008, the casino sold  of vacant land, which is in the North Las Vegas redevelopment zone, to the North Las Vegas.  The resumption of boxing on September 30, 2008 came with television coverage from Henderson based Margate Entertainment, using their TVSBoxing.net service.

References

External links
 

Buildings and structures in North Las Vegas, Nevada
Casinos in the Las Vegas Valley